Ashleigh Brazill (born 29 December 1989 in Campbelltown, New South Wales) is an Australian netball and AFL Women's player, playing both sports concurrently for  Collingwood Football Club. She has played for the West Coast Fever and New South Wales Swifts previously in her netball career.

Netball career

Domestic
Brazill made her domestic league debut for the New South Wales Swifts in 2010. She made the move to the West Coast Fever in 2012 and made an immediate impact, winning the club's MVP for the season. Brazill suffered with injuries over the next two seasons which restricted her time on court. Despite sitting out most of the 2014 ANZ Championship season Brazill captained Western Sting, leading the Fevers' reserves team to a bronze medal in the second-tier Australian Netball League (ANL). She was also named joint Player of the Year in the 2014 Australian Netball League. She was selected as captain of the Fever for the 2015 and 2016 seasons.

She signed with the Collingwood Magpies ahead of the 2017 Suncorp Super Netball season. Brazill has been hugely influential in wing-defence for the Magpies and her good form was rewarded with the club best and fairest award for the 2018 season.

Statistics
Statistics are correct to the end of the 2019 season.

|- style="background-color: #eaeaea"
! scope="row" style="text-align:center" | 2017
|style="text-align:center;"|Magpies
| 0/0 || 4 || 0 || 74 || 11 || 28 || 43 || 148 || 13 || 15 
|- 
! scope="row" style="text-align:center" | 2018
|style="text-align:center;"|Magpies
| 0/0 || 5 || 1 || 138 || 5 || 33 || 46 || 110 || 28 || 14
|- style="background-color: #eaeaea"
! scope="row" style="text-align:center" | 2019
|style="text-align:center;"|Magpies
| 0/0 || 84 || 0 || 61 || 120 || 18 || 68 || 116 || 34 || 15
|- class="sortbottom"
! colspan=2| Career
! 0/0
! 93
! 1
! 273
! 136
! 79
! 157
! 374
! 75
! 44
|}

International
In 2010, Brazill was one of the twelve players selected for the Australian Fast5 team. She took part in the 2011 World Netball Series in Liverpool and was Australia's best player for the series. She represented Australia again in the Fast5 series in 2013 and 2014. On 25 October 2015, Brazill made her senior debut for Australia in the third test of the 2015 Constellation Cup series against New Zealand. She was also a late replacement for Renae Ingles in the January 2016 tour of England.

Australian rules football career
On 18 October 2017, she was drafted to play for Collingwood in the 2018 AFL Women's season after being selected at pick 34.

Collingwood re-signed Brazill and appointed her vice-captain for the 2019 season. Brazill had a breakout season at the club and was named in the All-Australian team at the end of the season.

Statistics
Statistics are correct to the end of the S7 (2022) season.

|- 
| scope="row" text-align:center | 2018
|style="text-align:center;"|
| 10 || 2 || 0 || 0 || 15 || 7 || 22 || 5 || 5 || 0.0 || 0.0 || 7.5 || 3.5 || 11.0 || 2.5 || 2.5 || 0
|-
| scope="row" text-align:center | 2019
|style="text-align:center;"|
| 10 || 6 || 0 || 0 || 93 || 14 || 107 || 20 || 14 || 0.0 || 0.0 || bgcolor="DD6E81" | 15.5 || 2.3 || 17.8 || 3.3 || 2.3 || 3
|- 
| scope="row" text-align:center | 2020
|style="text-align:center;"|
| 10 || 4 || 0 || 0 || 29 || 24 || 53 || 10 || 6 || 0.0 || 0.0 || 7.3 || 6.0 || 13.3 || 2.5 || 1.5 || 0
|-
| scope="row" text-align:center | 2021
|style="text-align:center;"|
| 10 || 4 || 1 || 4 || 35 || 10 || 45 || 14 || 11 || 0.3 || 1.0 || 8.8 || 2.4 || 11.3 || 3.5 || 2.8 || 0
|- 
| scope="row" text-align:center | 2022
|style="text-align:center;"|
| 10 || 0 || — || — || — || — || — || — || — || — || — || — || — || — || — || — || —
|-
| scope="row" text-align:center | S7 (2022)
|style="text-align:center;"|
| 10 || 8 || 2 || 9 || 54 || 42 || 96 || 22 || 19 || 0.3 || 1.1 || 6.8 || 5.3 || 12.0 || 2.8 || 2.4 || 
|- class="sortbottom"
! colspan=3| Career
! 24
! 3
! 13
! 226
! 97
! 323
! 71
! 55
! 0.1
! 0.5
! 9.4
! 4.0
! 13.5
! 3.0
! 2.3
! 3
|}

Personal life
Brazill married her long-term partner Brooke Grieves on 30 January 2016 in Western Australia. At the time same-sex marriage was not legal in Australia. The couple celebrated the birth of their son Louis in January 2020.

References

External links

 Magpies Netball profile
 Super Netball profile
 Netball Draft Central profile

Australian netball players
Collingwood Football Club (AFLW) players
Collingwood Magpies Netball players
Netball players at the 2022 Commonwealth Games
Commonwealth Games gold medallists for Australia
Commonwealth Games medallists in netball
West Coast Fever players
LGBT netball players
Australian LGBT sportspeople
Lesbian sportswomen
LGBT players of Australian rules football
New South Wales Swifts players
1989 births
Living people
Severn Stars players
Suncorp Super Netball players
Australian Netball League players
Netball players from New South Wales
Western Sting players
Australian Institute of Sport netball players
Australia international Fast5 players
Australia international netball players
21st-century Australian LGBT people
Medallists at the 2022 Commonwealth Games